The NBL1 is a semi-professional basketball league in Australia. The league was founded in 2019.

List

See also

List of National Basketball League (Australia) seasons
List of WNBL seasons

References

External links

NBL1
NBL1